"Every Man a King" is a song cowritten by Louisiana's Governor and United States Senator Huey Long and Castro Carazo. Long was known for his political slogan "Every man a king," which is also the title of his 1933 autobiography and the catch-phrase of his Share Our Wealth proposal during the Great Depression. The song's lyrics include the lines "With castles and clothing and food for all/ All belongs to you". The song was co-written in 1935 by Huey Long and Castro Carazo, the band director of Louisiana State University, a former orchestra leader at the Roosevelt Hotel in New Orleans brought to LSU by Long himself.

Origin
The phrase "Every man a king, but no one wears a crown" was adopted from Democratic presidential candidate William Jennings Bryan. Long also used the phrase as a political slogan and as the name of his autobiography.

Lyrics

Recordings
The song was recorded by the Louisiana Boys in January 1935 (Bluebird B-5840) and again by the Louisiana Ramblers in October 1935, just a few weeks after Long's death (Decca 5151).

Singer-songwriter Randy Newman recorded the song on his 1974 album Good Old Boys.

References

References

Works cited

External links
 "Every Man a King" at the Tulane University Digital Library

Works by Huey Long
Political songs
1935 songs